Mohammad Rashid is a field hockey player from Pakistan. He was the member of Pakistani team in the 2010 Commonwealth Games in New Delhi, India.

See also
Pakistan national field hockey team

References

Pakistani male field hockey players
Field hockey players at the 2010 Commonwealth Games
Living people
Asian Games medalists in field hockey
Field hockey players at the 2010 Asian Games
Asian Games gold medalists for Pakistan
Medalists at the 2010 Asian Games
Year of birth missing (living people)
Commonwealth Games competitors for Pakistan
2010 Men's Hockey World Cup players
21st-century Pakistani people